David Abdul (born 17 August 1989) is an Aruban football player. Currently, he plays for SV Dakota and also features for the Aruba national team. In his early career, he played professionally for Sparta Rotterdam in the Dutch Eerste Divisie.

Club career
Abdul is a forward player who graduated through the Sparta academy and reserve teams, making his first team debut on 18 January 2009, aged 19 years and 154 days. In 2011, Abdul was the highest paid athlete from Aruba at $65,312 (USD).

Abdul was mostly used as a substitute for Sparta in his first three seasons, playing 6 league matches in two seasons. After Sparta relegated in the 2009–10 season, he became a more regular starter in the club's Eerste Divisie campaign.

He left Sparta after the 2010/2011 season for amateur side RVVH.  He later moved to Aruban Division di Honor side, SV Dakota

His brother Eric is a goalkeeper.

International career
Abdul is capped by the Aruba national football team.  He featured in both matches against St. Vincent and the Grenadines in the 2018 World Cup qualifiers.

References

External links
 
David Abdul player profile at sparta-rotterdam.nl
David Abdul stats at VI.nl

1989 births
Living people
Association football forwards
Aruban footballers
SV Dakota players
Aruban expatriate footballers
Dutch footballers
Sparta Rotterdam players
Eredivisie players
Eerste Divisie players
Aruba international footballers
People from Oranjestad, Aruba